The men's 10,000 metres was a track and field athletics event held as part of the Athletics at the 1912 Summer Olympics programme.  It was the debut of the event, which along with the 5000 metres replaced the 5 mile race held at the 1908 Summer Olympics. The competition was held on Sunday, July 7, 1912, and on Monday, July 8, 1912. Thirty runners from 13 nations competed. NOCs could enter up to 12 athletes.

Records

These were the standing world and Olympic records (in minutes) prior to the 1912 Summer Olympics.

Hannes Kolehmainen, in winning the first semifinal, set the Olympic record at 33:49.0.  It lasted until the next race, in which the time was beat by Len Richardson.  Kolehmainen took back the record with a time of 31:20.8 in the final.

Results

Semifinals

All semi-finals were held on Sunday, July 7, 1912.

Semifinal 1

Semifinal 2

Semifinal 3

Final

The final was held on Monday, July 8, 1912.

References

Sources
 
 

10000 metres
10,000 metres at the Olympics